South Kantō earthquakes or Greater Tokyo Area earthquakes are general terms for major earthquakes that occurs repeatedly historically in the southern part of Kanto region (Tokyo, Kanagawa, Chiba, Saitama, etc, Greater Tokyo Area) in Japan. It has been announced that there is a 70% chance that earthquakes of about M7 will occur in the southern part of the Kanto region within the next 30 years.

Tokyo (Greater Tokyo Area) is one of the largest cities in the world (populated area), if a large earthquake occurs in the southern part of the Kanto region, the damage is expected to be enormous. And also, indirect damage caused by the earthquake is thought to extend to the entire world for a long period of time. It has been announced that if a large earthquake occurs in the Greater Tokyo Area, would kill 23,000 people in the worst case.

Major earthquakes in the past 
This is a list of major earthquakes that have caused damage to the southern part of the Kanto region in the past.

 1293 Kamakura earthquake
 1703 Genroku earthquake
 1855 Edo earthquake
 1894 Tokyo earthquake
 1923 Great Kantō earthquake

See also 

 Kantō earthquakes
 Sagami Trough

References

External links 

 首都直下地震対策 - Cabinet Office
 首都直下地震の被害想定 - 朝日新聞
 首都直下地震 被害想定 死者約2万3000人 - NHK
関東地方の地震活動の特徴 - Headquarters for Earthquake Research Promotion

Earthquakes in Japan
History of the Kanto region